Palma Sola Bay is a bay located at the western side of Florida, near Bradenton, Florida. The bay is part of Tampa Bay.

References

Bays of Florida
Intracoastal Waterway
Bodies of water of Manatee County, Florida